Alexandrovka is a rural locality (a village) in Sanninsky Selsoviet, Blagoveshchensky District, Bashkortostan, Russia. The population was 40 as of 2010.

Geography 
It is located 39 km from Blagoveshchensk and 4 km from Sanninskoye.

References 

Rural localities in Blagoveshchensky District